RAAF Gingin , sometimes also RAAF Base Gingin or RAAF Base Gin Gin, is a Royal Australian Air Force (RAAF) small military airfield located at Gingin, in Western Australia.

History
There are no RAAF personnel based at Gingin.

In 2016 it was reported that the Australian Government had approved funding for the upgrade of the air traffic control tower at RAAF Gingin.

The airfield is used by the Pearce Aero Club, which keeps some aircraft there.

The airfield has previously been identified as the site for a second airport for Perth.

See also
 List of airports in Western Australia
 List of Royal Australian Air Force installations

References

External links

Royal Australian Air Force bases
Airports in Western Australia
Military installations in Western Australia
1960s establishments in Australia
Military airbases established in the 1960s
Shire of Gingin